Doi Mae Salong is a hill of Dan Lao range in Chiang Rai province, Thailand 6 km. from the border with Burma. This mountain rises in Mae Fa Luang District. Its summit is near the town of Santikhiri which is built on the ridge. Established in 1997 as the name Doi Mae Salong and this place is Mae Salong Nok sub-distinct. The height of this hill is about 950–1200 meters and the area is around 115.26 square meters and it is far away from Bangkok about 886 kilometers. Doi Mae Salong has nice weather throughout the year, It is coldest during December to January and also appropriate periods for travel. There are many tourist attractions. For temples such as Prabaromathat Chedi Srinakarindra Satismahasantikiri which is located on the highest of the hill. The monument is Tuan Cemetery, which is a Chinese army monument. The most famous places in Doi Mae Salong are tea plantations. for example, Tea plantation 101 and Wang Put Tan. For recommendations, tourists must taste Oolong tea at these places. The town at Doi Mae Salong is called Santi Khiri village. There is a small town where most of them are native Chinese but there are also differences in the 7 nationalities that we can classify into 3 large groups. This difference of nationalities caused by in the past this place was a settlement of the Chinese army which is The Kuomintang army in1961 after having been expelled from Burma. They help the Thai government to fight local communists in Thailand. Then, they were allowed to live in Doi Mae Salong and also have citizenship as Thai people.

History 
We can separate into 3 periods. In the beginning, humans found this area and the Chinese army used this hill as the camp. After that, the government started to plant tea and Three-needled pine. Finally, This hill was developed by the government for tourism.

During, Mao Zedong established the communist party in China. The Kuomintang army from China went to settle with about 15,000 soldiers at SantiKhiri. In 1969, they were official troops under Thai troops by the name CIF(Chinese Irregular Forces). And helped the Thai government to fight local communists in Thailand. They defeated the communists in Thailand. In 1982, because of their sacrifice, Thai government let them live in Doi Mae Salong normally and the Thai government gave Thai citizenship to them. Turn back to 1971, Doi Mae Salong is the famous place of a heroin refinery from opium cultivation. Then, They change their income to other sources such as fruit cultivation.

Kriangsak Chamanan, prime minister at that time supported and did a project to plant tea and Three needled pine for reforesting the place at Doi Mae Salong. Then, Doi Mae Salong is famous as the tourist attraction in the name of “Santi Khiri village” which means peaceful place. And the name Doi Mae Salong is from a Chinese word that is “Mei Shi Le” which also means peaceful place then it is twisted to Mae Salong and Doi means hill. Doi Mae Salong is famous in tea plantation and also other the cultivation of cherries, plums, lychee and peaches that tourist want to go to tasting tea and take picture of tea plantations.

In 1997, the Thai government made this hill as Mae Salong Nok Sub-district caused Doi Mae Salong to become the place that the Thai government take cares of officially. And They have been improving tourism, agriculture, and community to be better until the present.

Nationality 
There are 7 nationalities and they can be classified into 3 large groups. the nationalities that are Chinese, Thai Yai, Akha, Lahu, Mien, Lishu and Lawa. And to classify people into 3 large groups are Chinese people, Akha people, and Mien or Yao people. Most Chinese people live in Santi Khiri village. For the other two groups, they live in Mae Chan Luang, Mea Dee, Lao sib, etc. Most of them are from China or that they are sub-nationality of Chinese. In the past, a lot of Chinese people migrated to the mountain in many countries such as Myanmar, Laos, Cambodia, Vietnam, and also in Thailand.

Town 
Doi Mae Salong is a small town on the top of the mountain with the native Chinese and it is a tourist attraction with tea, coffee, and fruit plantation. There is a market selling local agricultural products from villagers in the morning and they exchange fruit and products together. Most of the restaurants are in the village where native Chinese cook Chinese food or Yunnan food. Most hotels in the village are homestays and the guesthouse owner is the villager. And some of the hotels are big hotels that have a large area with nature. Quiet especially plant is the Prunus cerasoides. They call in Thai is Nang Phaya Sua Krong. It plants a lot in the village on this hill.

Tourist Attraction 
The most famous activity at Doi Mae Salong is ‘Oolong tea tasting’. and also other agriculture such as coffee and fruit. This hill is full of the history and culture of the Chinese and other nations there are temples and monuments. It is the place to learn and contact cultural different.

Temple 
Prabaromathat Chedi Srinakarindra Satismahasantikiri is located on the top of the highest mountain of Mae Salong at an altitude of 1,500 m. It is an applied Lanna pagoda on a rectangular base, 30 meters high and 15 meters wide on each side with decorative gray tile. There are three arches on each side. The bell is decorated with gold leaf and a carved pattern. It was completed in 1996 to offer royal merit to Princess Srinagarindra. It is the highest point of Doi Mae Salong mountain where you can see the scenery especially in the evening.

Phra That Srimahapo Mongkol Boonchum is a Thai-Chinese Temple that was created by people in Doi Mae Salong with Phra Kru Boonchum on the occasion of the 60th anniversary of His Majesty King Bhumibol Adulyadej’s reign and 80th birthday that was consecrated on November 5, 2006. Inside the main hall of the temple, there is a Buddha image that is respected by the people in the area and there is Chinese architecture and sculptures inside. It is an applied Lanna pagoda on a rectangular base, approximately 30 meters high and about 15 meters wide on each side. Outside the decorative gray tile, there are three arches on each side, It is decorated with four standing Buddha images and the bell decorated with a gold leaf carved pattern.

Monument 

The memorial of Thai-Chinese descent is built for the Chinese army that helps the Thai government fight and suppress communism in Doi Luang, Doi Khao, and Doi Pha Mon areas, Chiang Rai province in 1971-1985, and Khao Ya area, Phetchabun province in 1981. After a result of the fighting, The Thai government imposes status on the former Chinese soldiers as a person who makes a contribution to Thailand and it is able to convert to Thai nationality. It is decorated in Chinese architecture. Inside there are exhibits of historical photographs, the hardships of setting in Thailand and has a library that collects relevant information of history.

Sala Kriangsak and Ban Kriangsak is the place of administrative division of planting tree-needled pine project in the past. Starting in 1973 General Kringsakl start a tea planting project by bringing good tea from Taiwan and then tried growing pine and building a Chinese pavilion in a pine forest to be used as the administrative division in the pine planting project, it was built in 1975. Later, a house was built to accommodate the officers who came to contact the government, it was completed in 1979 and in the same year there was a religious ceremony and pine trees were planted around the pavilion and the house. Therefore, the pavilion and house named “Sala Kriangsak and Ban Kriangsak” since then.

Tuan Cemetery was built in 1980. It is located on the hill above the village that altitude approximately 1,300 m. It was built to commemorate the history of the former Chinese soldiers who helped the Thai government to fight and suppress communism in the Doi Luang, Doi Khoa and Doi Pha Mon. Descendants of Chinese always worship and go to this place every year. This cemetery is located behind Khum Nai Phol resort that can see the view of the village.

Natural Place 

Mae Salong flower hill is the garden hill of flowers that people decorate with the word Doi Mae Salong in Thai. It is one of the biggest colorful flower gardens at Doi Mae Salong. It is located in the Doi Mok Dok Mai Resort (Mae Salong flower hill resort) and it is also the check-in spot where every tourist must take a picture without any entry fee. There are souvenir shops and tea shops from the villagers and also Yunnan restaurants.

Wang Put Tan is a tea plantation and it also has a cafe that serves tea and cake, Yunnan restaurant, and a hotel. The Wang Put Tan Tea plantation has three of the world’s largest teapots and a gold lion and silver lion to attract tourists. The location of this place is beautiful. The tourists can see the view of the mountain with tea plantations and they prepare photo spots for tourists. This is one of the tea plantations completed.

Tea plantation 101 is the most famous tea plantation at Doi Mae Salong and received the best tea of the world award. Then fine tea production and exported to distribute around the world. They plant 2 types of Oolong tea that are Three young leaves No.12 tea and Four seasons tea. The tourist can see the tea terracing and procedure of harvesting tea and produce. The demonstration of the best procedure to infuse the tea. And also the tea tasting.

The Nang Phaya Sua Krong trees, In 1982, It was planted at Doi Mae Salong and it is a vernacular tree in the North of Thailand. Its flower has light pink color. When it blooms it is like a Sakura in Japan, most people call it Sakura Thailand. On the road leading to Doi Mae Salong will have The Nang Phaya Sua Krong trees along a distance of more than 4 Kilometers and The Nang Phaya Sua Krong trees will shed leaves then it blooms full of the tree in early January or winter of every year.

Food 
Doi Mae Salong have many dishes for tourist to try and the most recommended dishes when going to Doi Mae Salong is Yunnan food.

Mae Salong Market is the biggest market in Doi Mae Salong. It organizes all agricultural products, local tea, local products, and souvenirs.

Doi Mae Salong Morning Market is a local market that opens in the morning about 6 am. to 8 am. The tourists will see the real way of life here. It has an area of about 300 square meters located against the road. Most sellers and customers are villagers.

Im Pochana restaurant is one of the famous restaurants at Doi Mae Salong which serves Yunnan food. The signature dish is pork knuckle in brown sauce with Mantou (Chinese Bun). It is one of the oldest restaurant at Doi Mae Salong.

Geography 
Doi Mae Salong is located in the Daen Lao Range, In Chiang Rai province, North of Thailand. It's a high mountain with complex mountain ranges and a plain between the foothills. In the middle, it is a hill and channel. The height of this hill is about 950–1200 meters from the mean sea level. The area of Mae Salong Nok Subdistrict has around 115.26 square kilometers.

Climate 
The weather in Doi Mae Salong has cool weather all year round. The average temperature is between 15-20 degrees Celsius and the temperature will drop between 4-6 degrees Celsius during December - January that is the coldest in Doi Mae Salong. At night, the hottest season during April, the temperature is between 25-32 degrees Celsius. In the daytime cool weather, not too hot or cold during June - November, the temperature is between 15-20 degrees Celsius.

References

External links
Chiang Rai Travel Guide - Doi Mae Salong
Doi Mae Salong - You Tube

See also
Thai highlands
List of mountains in Thailand

Daen Lao Range
Mountains of Thailand
Geography of Chiang Rai province